The Moheli scops owl (Otus moheliensis) is a scops owl endemic to the island of Mohéli, one of the Comoro Islands.

Description
The Moheli scops owl has two colour morphs, the rufous morph has reddish-brown plumage which is and weakly marked with dark streaks and bars; the brown morph has a darker brown plumage, which is boldly marked with streaks and vermiculations. Both morphs have yellow-green eyes, grey legs and black beaks.

Voice
The Moheli scops owl is highly vocal, producing hissing whistles and screeches in a series of five notes, as well as screeching.

Distribution and habitat

Behaviour
The Moheli scops owl is strictly nocturnal and becomes active only after sunset. Calling males have been recorded in September. The diet is probably mainly made up of insects.

Conservation and status
The species was only described in 1998. It has an estimated population of 400, and is classified as critically endangered due to it being restricted to such a small area, which is being rapidly deforested. In 1995, only five percent of the island still had intact, dense, humid forest. As well as habitat loss, other threats to the Moheli scops owl include hunting and black rats, which may eat its eggs and young but also compete with it for food. At present, the montane forest where the Moheli scops owl occurs is not protected.

References

External links
BirdLife Species Factsheet

Moheli scops owl
Mohéli
Endemic birds of the Comoros
Critically endangered fauna of Africa
Moheli scops owl